The 2014 IGLFA World Championship was the 21st officially recognized world championship event for the IGLFA.  It was held in Akron, Ohio from August 9th through 15th as the football (soccer) competition part of the 2014 Gay Games.

The tournament was won by three-time defending Gay Games soccer champions Stonewall F.C. from London, England (after finishing third in the group stage) for their fourth consecutive Gay Games title and tenth overall IGLFA title.

Participating clubs

*The Toronto Women also participated in the Men's D2 competition

Results

Men's Div.I

Group stage
Top four qualify to DI semifinals.

Playoffs

SAFG did not play the third-place match; third place was awarded to United FC.

Men's Div.II

Group stage
Top two teams from each group advance to semifinals.

Bracket A

Bracket B

Playoffs

Women's Div.
With only two teams registered to play, full competition was canceled, with only a final played.  While the official Gay Games 9 results site names the runner-up as "Global FC", both the official IGLFA site and the FTSC site claim FTSC were the second-place team.  The Toronto Women defeated the Federal Triangles Women by a score of 5–1.

References

International LGBT sports organizations
I
IGLFA World Championship
IGLFA World Championship
IGLFA World Championship
I
Soccer in Ohio